NGC 5927 is a globular cluster in the constellation Lupus. NGC 5927 has a diameter of about 12 arcminutes and an apparent magnitude of +8.86. Its Shapley–Sawyer Concentration Class is VIII, and it contains stars of magnitude 15 and dimmer.

The globular cluster was discovered by the astronomer James Dunlop in 1826 and was also observed in 1834 by John Herschel.

NGC 5927 is relatively metal-rich for a globular cluster, and may have multiple generations of stars.

References

External links
 
 NGC 5927

Globular clusters
Lupus (constellation)
5927